Harry Guest (born Henry Bayly Guest; 6 October 1932 – 20 March 2021) was a British poet born in Wales.

Life and career 
Harry Guest was educated at Malvern College and read Modern Languages at Trinity Hall, Cambridge. He wrote a thesis on Mallarmé at the Sorbonne. At Trinity Hall he co-edited the poetry magazine Chequer, which continued for eleven issues and published poems by Thom Gunn, Anne Stevenson, Ted Hughes, and Sylvia Plath, though there is no evidence to suggest he met Plath or Hughes. From 1955-66, he taught at Felsted School and Lancing College, and then moved to Japan, becoming a lecturer in English at Yokohama National University. He returned to England in 1972 and was Head of French at Exeter School until his retirement in 1991. A selection of his poetry was included in Penguin Modern Poets 16. He was an Honorary Research Fellow at the University of Exeter and was awarded an honorary doctorate (LittD) by Plymouth University in 1998. Apart from his many collections of poetry, he is well known as a translator from the French and Japanese, and has published several novels and non-fiction books including the Traveller's Literary Companion to Japan (1994) and The Artist on the Artist (2000). His translations include a selected poems of Victor Hugo, The Distance, The Shadows (2002) and Post-War Japanese Poetry (with Lynn Guest and Kajima Shôzô, 1972). He lived in Exeter, and was married to the historical novelist Lynn Guest, they have two children.

Works
A Different Darkness, London: Outposts, 1964
Arrangements, Northwood, UK: Anvil, 1968
The Cutting-Room, London: Anvil, 1970
The Place, Northamptonshire, UK: Sceptre, 1971
Mountain Journal, Sheffield, UK: Rivelin, 1975
A House Against the Night, London: Anvil, 1976
English Poems, London: Words, 1976
Days, London: Anvil, 1978
Elegies, Durham, UK: Pig, 1980
Lost and Found, London: Anvil, 1983
The Emperor of Outer Space, Durham, UK: Pig, 1983
Lost Pictures, Exeter, UK: Albertine, 1991
Coming to Terms, London: Anvil, 1994
So Far, Exeter, UK: Stride, 1998
Versions, Nether Stowey, UK: Odyssey, 1999
A Puzzling Harvest, Collected Poems 1955-2000, London: Anvil, 2002
Time After Time, Exeter, UK: Albertine, 2005
Comparisons & Conversions,  Exeter, UK: Shearsman, 2009
Some Times, London: Anvil, 2010

References

External links
The Writers of Wales Database
Harry Guest Anvil Press
Harry Guest Shearsman Titles 
Translated Penguin Book - at  Penguin First Editions reference site of early first edition Penguin Books.

1932 births
2021 deaths
Academic staff of Yokohama National University
English male poets